Sharon Garcia Magdayao (born October 17, 1975), known by her stage name Vina Morales, is a Filipino actress, singer, entrepreneur and model. Dubbed as the “Ultimate Performer” by various media outlets, she has won 2 Awit Awards including the prestigious 'Album of the Year', the country's equivalent of the Grammys.

Morales is a 2-time Best Actress nominee at the FAMAS Awards. She is the first ever champion at the IKON Asean music competition. She has already starred in 43 films, 21 TV shows and has released 14 studio albums throughout her 35-year career. In 2003, Morales became the first Filipino artist to perform at the New York International Music Festival held at the Palms Casino Resort in Las Vegas. In 2022, Morales teamed up with American singer-songwriter Jim Brickman for her US concert tour “Your Love”.

In her late teen years, Morales has appeared in several classic films such as “Ang Utol Kong Hoodlum,” “Anghel Na Walang Langit,” and “The Sarah Balabagan Story.”

Biography

Career
At age nine, Magdayao started singing with the choir of Saint Vincent Ferrer Parish Church in Bogo. Father Fritz T. Malinao, a priest and a songwriter in his church community, discovered Magdayao's talent and asked her to sing one of his compositions as an entry in the Cebu Pop Music Festival. The song, "Paglaum", which means "hope" or "pag-asa" in the Cebuano language, won the Grand Prize and earned the Best Interpreter Award for young talents in the Philippines.

Representatives from Viva Films, headed by Jesus "Boy" Bosque, saw her performance and offered her a singing and acting contract. Magdayao and her family moved to Manila where she auditioned for a film career in the Philippine film industry. She changed her birth name from Sharon Garcia Magdayao to Vina Morales.

Morales' first film debut was Nakagapos na Puso where she co-starred with Sharon Cuneta. In her late teen years, Morales appeared in Ang Utol Kong Hoodlum and Anghel Na Walang Langit. She also appeared in The Sarah Balabagan Story.

Morales recorded albums and performed in live concerts in the Philippines, including 2004's Mamahalin Ka Niya. She co-wrote the lyrics of a song titled Paano Kaya Magtatagpo?, along with Filipino model, actor and musician, Piolo Pascual. The music was composed by Arnel de Pano. Later, Morales and Pascual recorded the song as a duet. Other songs on the album include Yakapin Mo Ako, Pangako and Saan Darating ang Umaga. In 2003, she held a multi-city United States tour titled Vina Revealed and Vina's Hot.

Morales performed the song Yakapin Mo Ako while portraying singer Joey Albert in the drama anthology Maalaala Mo Kaya. In 2002, she co-hosted a series of Philippine shows with Martin Nievera in the United States and Canada. She was the first Filipino to sing at the New York International Music Festival held at the Palms Hotel in Las Vegas in 2003. In 2006, she also did a tour in the United States.

In 2007, she starred in ABS-CBN's soap opera Maria Flordeluna. She also represented the Philippines at the 2007 Ikon Asean singing contest and won the competition.

In 2010, Morales was cast as Mercedes Cristi in another ABS-CBN soap opera Agua Bendita, starring Andi Eigenmann.

In 2011, she marked her very first antagonist role in the ABS-CBN late night drama Nasaan Ka Elisa?, a remake of the 2010 Telemundo telenovela ¿Dónde está Elisa? which is an adaptation of the original 2009 Chilean telenovela of the same name. She played the role of Cecile Altamira, sister of Mariano Altamira (Albert Martinez) and wife of Bruno de Silva (Eric Fructuoso).

In 2013, she was cast as Magnolia Alegre in the primetime drama Maria Mercedes, a remake of the 1992 Mexican telenovela of the same name that starred Thalía. She later makes a movie comeback with Robin Padilla in the 2014 MMFF film Bonifacio: Ang Unang Pangulo.

In 2015, she starred in the afternoon drama Nasaan Ka Nang Kailangan Kita in the role of Cecilia Macaraeg. The next year, Morales played the role of Janella Salvador's mother in the 2016 romantic drama Born for You.

In 2018, she played her second antagonist role in Precious Hearts Romances presents Araw Gabi. She portrays Celestina de Alegre, the mortal enemy of Adrian Olvidar (JM de Guzman).

Personal life
Morales is the sister of actress and dancer Shaina Magdayao. She has a daughter named Ceana born in 2009.

Discography
 Vina (1990, Viva Records)
 Forbidden (1992, Viva Records)
 Best of Vina (1993, Viva Records)
 'Pag Katabi Kita (1994, Viva Records)
 Easy To Love (1995, PolyEast Records)
 Look at Me Now (1996, PolyEast Records)
 All That I Want (1998, PolyEast Records)
 No Limits (1999, PolyEast Records)
 Total Control (2001, PolyEast Records)
 Reflections (2002, PolyEast Records)
 Mamahalin Ka Niya (2004, Star Music)
 Vina: Silver Series (2006, Viva Records)
 Awit ng Ating Buhay (2010, Star Music)
 Vina Morales (30th Anniversary Album) (2016, Star Music)

Filmography

Film

Television

Awards

References

External links

1975 births
Living people
21st-century Filipino actresses
21st-century Filipino women singers
Actresses from Cebu
Filipino child actresses
Filipino women pop singers
Filipino film actresses
Filipino people of American descent
Filipino people of Scottish descent
Filipino people of Spanish descent
Filipino television actresses
People from Bogo, Cebu
Singers from Cebu
Visayan people
That's Entertainment (Philippine TV series)
That's Entertainment Thursday Group Members
GMA Network personalities
ABS-CBN personalities
Star Magic
Star Music artists
Star Circle Quest
TV5 (Philippine TV network) personalities
Viva Artists Agency
Viva Records (Philippines) artists